The 52nd Battalion (New Ontario), CEF, was an infantry battalion of the Canadian Expeditionary Force during the Great War.

History 
The 52nd Battalion was authorized on 7 November 1914 and embarked for Britain on 23 November 1915. It disembarked in France on 21 February 1916, where it fought as part of the 9th Canadian Brigade, 3rd Canadian Division in France and Flanders until the end of the war. The battalion was disbanded on 30 August 1920.

The 52nd Battalion recruited in Port Arthur, Kenora, Fort Frances and Dryden, Ontario and was mobilized at Port Arthur.

The 52nd Battalion had seven Officers Commanding:
Lt-Col A.W. Hay, 23 November 1915 – 3 June 1916
Lt.-Col. D.M. Sutherland, 27 July 1916 – 25 September 1916
Lt.-Col. W.B. Evans, DSO, 25 September 1916 – 11 July 1917
Maj. E.A.C. Wilcox, 11 July 1917 – 4 August 1917
Lt.-Col. W.W. Foster, DSO, 4 August 1917 – 24 September 1918
Lt.-Col. D.M. Sutherland, DSO, 24 September 1918 – 9 October 1918
Lt.-Col. W.W. Foster, DSO, 9 October 1918-Demobilization

One member of the 52nd Battalion was awarded the Victoria Cross. Captain Christopher O'Kelly was awarded the Victoria Cross for his actions on 26 October 1917 at Passchendaele, Belgium. He had previously been awarded the Military Cross.

Battle Honours 
The 52nd Battalion was awarded the following battle honours:
Mount Sorrel
Somme, 1916
Flers-Courcelette
Ancre Heights
Arras, 1917, '18
Vimy, 1917
HILL 70
Ypres 1917
Passchendaele
Amiens
Scarpe, 1918
Drocourt-Quéant
Hindenburg Line
Canal du Nord
Cambrai, 1918
Valenciennes
France and Flanders, 1916-18

Perpetuation 
The 52nd Battalion (New Ontario), CEF, is perpetuated by The Lake Superior Scottish Regiment.

See also 

 List of infantry battalions in the Canadian Expeditionary Force

References

Sources
Canadian Expeditionary Force 1914-1919 by Col. G.W.L. Nicholson, CD, Queen's Printer, Ottawa, Ontario, 1962

052
Military units and formations of Ontario
Lake Superior Scottish Regiment